R573 road may refer to:
 R573 road (Ireland)
 R573 road (South Africa)